Betty Jean Maker (10 December 1925 – 2 February 2004) was an Australian-born New Zealand cricketer who played as an all-rounder, batting left-handed and bowling left-arm medium. She appeared in three Test matches for New Zealand in 1966. She played domestic cricket for Victoria and Wellington.

References

External links
 
 

1925 births
2004 deaths
Cricketers from Melbourne
New Zealand women cricketers
New Zealand women Test cricketers
Victoria women cricketers
Wellington Blaze cricketers
Australian emigrants to New Zealand